Cefin Arthur Campbell (born June 1958) is a Welsh Plaid Cymru politician who has been Member of the Senedd (MS) for Mid and West Wales region since 2021.

Academic career 
Campbell is a former Lecturer working at Swansea University teaching Welsh for adults and Cardiff University teaching Welsh Language and Literature and Welsh History.

He was appointed to lead the first Menter Iaith (Community Language Initiative) in Wales in 1991. Campbell was a member of the S4C Authority, and also as a language advisor to Bòrd na Gàidhlig in Scotland. He also worked as a school inspector with Estyn.

In 2008 Campbell started Sbectrwm consulting firm specializing in research, strategic planning, project management and training. He was the director until his election to the Senedd.

Political career 
He was elected as a Carmarthenshire county Councillor for Llanfihangel Aberbythych in 2012, and again in 2017 when he became Executive Board member for Communities and Rural Affairs. As an Executive Board member he chaired a cross-party group that developed a comprehensive strategy to promote the Welsh language within the Council, a strategy to regenerate rural Carmarthenshire, an innovative plan to tackle poverty, an action plan to ensure that Carmarthenshire reaches net zero carbon by 2035 and produced a report to tackle racism and discrimination.

In the 2021 Senedd election, Campbell stood in the Carmarthen West and South Pembrokeshire constituency and came third with 6,615 votes. He also stood at the top of the Mid and West regional list for Plaid Cymru and was elected.

He is the Plaid Cymru shadow spokesperson for Rural Affairs and Agriculture, and also has an interest in supporting legislation to tackle the second homes crisis, tackling poverty and creating one million Welsh speakers.

Personal life 
Campbell is married with three daughters and lives in Gelli Aur, Carmarthenshire. His family on his father’s side were miners and on his mother’s side were farmers.

References 

1950 births
Living people
Plaid Cymru members of the Senedd
Welsh-speaking politicians
Wales MSs 2021–2026
Plaid Cymru councillors